Antanas is a Lithuanian masculine given name derived from Antonius that is equivalent to Anthony in Lithuania. It may refer to:
Antanas Andrijauskas (born 1948), Lithuanian philosopher
Antanas Bagdonavičius (born 1938), Lithuanian rower and Olympic medalist
Antanas Baranauskas (1835–1902), Lithuanian poet, mathematician and catholic bishop
Antanas Ričardas Druvė (1867-1919), Lithuanian military officer and colonel in Russian military
Antanas Gustaitis (1898-1941), Lithuanian military general, aviator and aerospace engineer
Antanas Guoga (Tony G) (born 1973), Lithuanian-born Australian businessman and professional poker player
Antanas Janauskas (born 1937), Lithuanian animation film director, designer and writer
Antanas Jaroševičius (1870–1956), Lithuanian painter
Antanas Juška (1819–1880), Lithuanian Roman Catholic pastor, lexicographer, folklorist, and musicologist
Antanas Karoblis (1940–2007), Lithuanian politician
Antanas Kavaliauskas (born 1984), Lithuanian basketball player
Antanas Krištopaitis (1921–2011), Lithuanian painter, ethnographer and social activist
Antanas Lingis (1905–1941), Lithuanian footballer
Antanas Maceina (1908–1987), Lithuanian philosopher, existentialist, educator, theologian, and poet
Antanas Mackevičius (1828–1863), Lithuanian priest and an initiator and leader of the 1863 January Uprising
Antanas Merkys (1887-1955), Lithuanian politician, former Prime Minister Lithuania
Antanas Mikėnas (1924–1994), Lithuanian track and field athlete and Olympic medalist
Antanas Mockus (born 1952), Colombian mathematician, philosopher, and politician
Antanas Pocius (1913-1983), Lithuanian choirmaster, organist and composer
Antanas Purėnas (1881-1962), Lithuanian organic chemist and politician
Antanas Račas (born 1940), Lithuanian politician
Antanas Šileika (born 1953), Canadian novelist and critic
Antanas Sireika (born 1956), Lithuanian basketball coach
Antanas Škėma (1910-1961),  Lithuanian writer, stage actor and director
Antanas Smetona (1874–1944), Lithuanian politician, former President of Lithuania
Antanas Sniečkus (1903–1974), Lithuanian communist politician
Antanas Strazdas (1760–1833) Lithuanian priest and 
Antanas Sutkus (born 1939), Lithuanian photographer 
Antanas Valionis (born 1950), Lithuanian politician
Antanas Venclova (1906– 1971), Lithuanian and Soviet politician, poet, journalist and translator
Antanas Vienuolis (1882—1957), Lithuanian writer and dramatist
Antanas Vileišis (1856–1919), Lithuanian politician
Antanas Vinkus (born 1942), Lithuanian diplomat and politician
Antanas Vivulskis (1877–1919), Polish-Lithuanian architect and sculptor
Antanas Žmuidzinavičius (1876–1966), Lithuanian painter and artist

References

Masculine given names
Lithuanian masculine given names